

The North Omaha Creek Bridge was a historic Pin-connected Pratt truss bedstead bridge that was built in 1905, located on 26 Road, a north–south rural road in Thurston County, Nebraska.

When photographed in 2010, the bridge was posted with a  weight limit sign.

It was listed on the National Register of Historic Places in 1992, and was delisted in 2019.

It had a timber decking over transverse steel I-beam stringers.

The bridge is apparently no longer extant, as a November 2016 photo, by the same photographer as in 2010, shows a new bridge under construction.

See also
 
 
 
 List of bridges on the National Register of Historic Places in Nebraska
 National Register of Historic Places listings in Thurston County, Nebraska

Notes

References

External links
More photos of North Omaha Creek Bridge at Wikimedia Commons

Bridges on the National Register of Historic Places in Nebraska
Bridges completed in 1905
National Register of Historic Places in Thurston County, Nebraska
Transportation in Thurston County, Nebraska
Steel bridges in the United States
Pratt truss bridges in the United States
Road bridges in Nebraska
Former National Register of Historic Places in Nebraska
1905 establishments in Nebraska